Strandon is a suburb of New Plymouth, in the western North Island of New Zealand. It is located to the east of the city centre.

Demographics

Strandon had a population of 2,535 at the 2018 New Zealand census, an increase of 21 people (0.8%) since the 2013 census, and an increase of 48 people (1.9%) since the 2006 census. There were 1,038 households, comprising 1,194 males and 1,341 females, giving a sex ratio of 0.89 males per female. The median age was 46.7 years (compared with 37.4 years nationally), with 372 people (14.7%) aged under 15 years, 426 (16.8%) aged 15 to 29, 1,167 (46.0%) aged 30 to 64, and 570 (22.5%) aged 65 or older.

Ethnicities were 88.5% European/Pākehā, 11.6% Māori, 1.2% Pacific peoples, 6.6% Asian, and 1.8% other ethnicities. People may identify with more than one ethnicity.

The percentage of people born overseas was 18.5, compared with 27.1% nationally.

Although some people chose not to answer the census's question about religious affiliation, 47.2% had no religion, 41.8% were Christian, 0.1% had Māori religious beliefs, 1.4% were Hindu, 0.6% were Muslim, 0.5% were Buddhist and 1.2% had other religions.

Of those at least 15 years old, 531 (24.5%) people had a bachelor's or higher degree, and 303 (14.0%) people had no formal qualifications. The median income was $34,100, compared with $31,800 nationally. 462 people (21.4%) earned over $70,000 compared to 17.2% nationally. The employment status of those at least 15 was that 1,035 (47.9%) people were employed full-time, 351 (16.2%) were part-time, and 57 (2.6%) were unemployed.

Education
New Plymouth Girls' High School  is a single-sex state secondary school (years 9–13) with a roll of  students as of  The school separated from New Plymouth High School in 1914, leaving New Plymouth Boys' High School on the old site.

Sacred Heart Girls' College is a single-sex state-integrated Catholic secondary and intermediate school (years 7–13) with a roll of  students as of  The school started in 1884 and moved to its current site in 1960.

Notes

Suburbs of New Plymouth